Leucodictyids are heterotrophic amoeboid protists that comprise the order Leucodictyida in the phylum Cercozoa.

Morphology
Leucodictyids are biciliate amoebae with branching filopodia that are capable of fusing temporarily with each other to form structures known as meroplasmodia. These filopodia can bear extrusomes, and are appressed to the
substrate while supported in part by irregularly arranged microtubules. Inside the cell itself, an important characteristic is the presence of tubular mitochondrial cristae.

Taxonomy
Leucodictyida was described in 1993 as a monotypic order containing only the family Leucodictyidae. Later, in 2003, it was emended to also contain the family Massisteriidae. It currently contains a total of 4 genera.
Family Leucodictyidae 
Leucodictyon 
Reticulamoeba 
Family Massisteriidae 
Massisteria 
Minimassisteria

References

External links

Cercozoa orders